Cafayate is a department located in Salta Province, in northwestern Argentina.

Situated in the south of the province and with an area of  it borders the departments of San Carlos, La Viña, Guachipas and the provinces of Tucumán and Catamarca.

Towns and municipalities
 Cafayate
 Tolombón
 Las Conchas
 Santa Bárbara

Geography 
The main rivers in the region are Calchaquí, and Santa María. Both end at the area called Las Juntas or La Ciénaga, joining at the beginning of the Las Conchas river, which runs in the same-named vallery to the northwest, ending at the Cabra Corral reservoir.

Tourism 
The Departament is known for its vineyards. Cafayate has other tourist sites such as an 18th-century mill built by the Jesuits which is still used on occasion for the tourism trade.

References

External links 

 Departments of Salta Province website

Departments of Salta Province